Rear-Admiral John Talbot Savignac Hall, CIE (30 November 1896 – 21 January 1964) was a Royal Navy officer who became the first post-Independence Commander-in-Chief and Chief of Naval Staff of the Royal Indian Navy.

Early life
Hall was born in Kent, the third son of Dr. William Hamilton Hall, FSA. He was educated at Elstow School in Bedford and then served in the Merchant Navy before being co-opted into the Royal Navy on his 18th birthday.

Naval career
In 1921, he was commissioned as a lieutenant in the Royal Indian Marine, and was promoted to lieutenant-commander in 1928. The following year, he became the executive officer on HMIS Lawrence a minesweeper and then transferred to another minesweeper, HMIS Clive in 1930. In 1932, he was appointed commanding officer of the patrol boat HMIS Baluchi. He held this command until 1934. From February to July 1937, Hall was appointed Officer-in-Charge, Navy Office Section for the Defence Department (Navy Branch) of the Government of India. In April 1937, he was promoted to commander. In 1938, he was appointed Staff Officer (Plans), Naval HQ, aboard HMIS Dalhousie.

Hall was promoted to commodore 2nd Class on 1 December 1942, and appointed chief of staff to the Commander-in-Chief of the RIN. In January 1944, he was promoted to captain and appointed a Companion of the Order of the Indian Empire. He was then appointed as the Senior Naval Staff Officer and RIN liaison officer to the India Office, serving in this capacity until 1946. Hall then commanded HMS Achilles. Upon Indian independence, he was selected to become the first post-Independence Commander-in-Chief of the Royal Indian Navy. Hall served for one year, when he was replaced by Admiral Edward Parry.

Afterwards, in his permanent rank of captain, Hall commanded a destroyer squadron with HMIS Delhi (later INS Delhi) as his flagship. On 1 April 1950, he was promoted to the substantive rank of rear-admiral in the newly renamed Indian Navy. He retired from active duty on 1 September 1950, with the rank of rear-admiral. From 1951 to 1959, he served as a civil defence officer for northeast Essex. Hall died in London in 1964, aged 67.

Personal life
In 1933, he married Agnes Maud Shereen; the couple had one daughter (Elizabeth Anne) and a son (also John) who died in a missile hook-up accident while training with the Fleet Air-arm of the Scottish coast near HMS Fulmar, RNAS (now RAF) Lossiemouth.

References

1896 births
1964 deaths
Companions of the Order of the Indian Empire
Royal Navy rear admirals
Royal Indian Navy admirals
Chiefs of the Naval Staff (India)
Military personnel from Kent
Royal Navy personnel of World War I